A leadership election for Christian and Democratic Union – Czechoslovak People's Party (KDU-ČSL) was held on 12 November 2005. The incumbent leader Miroslav Kalousek received almost 80% of votes and was reelected. Kalousek didn't have a rival.

References

KDU-ČSL leadership elections
2005 elections in the Czech Republic
2005 Christian and Democratic Union - Czechoslovak People's Party
Indirect elections
Christian and Democratic Union - Czechoslovak People's Party leadership election